United Nations Security Council Resolution 1657, adopted unanimously on February 6, 2006, after recalling previous resolutions on the situation in Côte d'Ivoire (Ivory Coast), including resolutions 1609 (2005), 1626 (2005) and 1652 (2005), the Council authorised a temporary redeployment of troops from the United Nations Mission in Liberia (UNMIL) to the United Nations Operation in Côte d'Ivoire (UNOCI).

Resolution

Observations
The Security Council was very concerned about the ongoing political crisis in Côte d'Ivoire, and obstacles to the peace process from all sides.  It noted that the mandate of UNMIL was to expire on March 31, 2006, and that the situation in Côte d'Ivoire continued to pose a threat to international peace and security.

Acts
Under Chapter VII powers, the Council authorised a temporary redeployment of one infantry company from UNMIL to UNOCI until March 31, 2006 in order to provide extra security and perform tasks carried out by UNOCI.  The measure would be renewed within 30 days if necessary, with Council members keeping additional redeployments under review.

See also
 First Ivorian Civil War
 List of United Nations Security Council Resolutions 1601 to 1700 (2005–2006)
 Opération Licorne
 United Nations Operation in Côte d'Ivoire

References

External links
 
Text of the Resolution at undocs.org

 1657
 1657
 1657
2006 in Ivory Coast
February 2006 events